Zmajevac is a settlement in the region of Baranja, Croatia. Administratively, it is located in the Kneževi Vinogradi municipality within the Osijek-Baranja County. The population is 974 people.

Ethnic groups (2001 census)
701 - Hungarians
178 - Croats
10 - Serbs
85 - others

References 

Kneževi Vinogradi